Deuteragonista is a genus of flies in the family Empididae.

Species
D. bicolor Philippi, 1865
D. denotata Collin, 1933
D. fulvilata Collin, 1933
D. lutea (Bezzi, 1909)
D. stigmatica Collin, 1933
D. terminalis Collin, 1933
D. thoracica Collin, 1933
D. villosula Bigot, 1889

References

Empidoidea genera
Empididae